Mariyala-Gangawadi is a railway station on Mysore–Chamarajanagar branch line.
The station is located in Chamarajanagara District, Karnataka state, India.

Location
Mariyala-Gangavadi railway station is located near Mariyala village in Chamarajanagar district.

History 
The project cost . The gauge conversion work of the  stretch was completed.
There are six trains running forward and backward in this route.  Five of them are slow moving passenger trains.

Image gallery

See also
 Badanaguppe
 Kellamballi
 Chamarajanagar

References

Railway stations in Chamarajanagar district
Mysore railway division